Carmelite mail is a colonial building in Caracas, Venezuela located in the historic center of the city on the Carmelites corner of Avenida Urdaneta. It is located in the Cathedral Parish of the Libertador Bolivarian Municipality.

The construction of the house dates back to 1781 remain the property of Count Martin de Tovar. Among the most notable visitors that building has received include Alexander von Humboldt and Aimé Bonpland in 1799 and Simon Bolivar in 1827, and was presidential bedroom house between 1860 and 1861, then the building would be used as the headquarters of the Ministry of War and Navy. By 1932 the structure of the house is almost completely modified including the construction of a new Gothic facade, doors, windows and third floor while retaining original features such as some walls and stone staircase, from that moment becomes the Mail headquarters Caracas. In 1984 he was declared a National Historic Landmark.

Gallery

See also
 List of people on stamps of Venezuela
 Postage stamps and postal history of Venezuela

References

External links

 Gobierno del Distrito Capital: Correo de Carmelita

Video 
 Youtube: Caracas: Avenida Urdaneta de Santa Capilla al Correo Carmelitas

Philately of Venezuela
Buildings and structures in Caracas
Houses in Venezuela